"Back on My Feet" (stylized as "BACK ON MY FEET") is the tenth single by Japanese electronica/rock duo the Boom Boom Satellites, released on July 1, 2009.  It is their first release in two years. The title track "Back on My Feet" is used as an opening theme for the Japanese television broadcast of Xam'd: Lost Memories (alternating with "Shut Up And Explode" from Exposed). Two limited edition versions of the EP were released: one contained a DVD with the music video for "Back on My Feet" and the other was a special Bounen no Zamned version.

Track listing

External links 
 
 

2009 singles
2009 songs
Boom Boom Satellites songs